Via de Zenta, known simply as Zeta was a medieval road connecting the Adriatic with the medieval Serbian state. It started from the mouth of the Bojana, the Skadar port, (alternatively Bar then Cetinje) along the Drin Valley to Prizren, then to Lipljan, then through Novo Brdo to Vranje and Niš. The Republic of Venice and Ragusa used the road for trade with Serbia and Bulgaria. From Niš, the ancient Roman road of Via Militaris continued all the way to Constantinople. The road ended its use with the Ottoman conquest of this part of Serbia by 1392, after the earlier Ottoman conquest of the southern provinces of Macedonia (1371), the Ottomans having begun their European conquest at Gallipoli (1354).

The Venetian traders, who were the most frequent users of the road, used it for export of wheat, animals, silver and grape from Serbia and Bulgaria to Italy. It was among the most important communication links of Ragusa and its hinterland. The other road connecting hinterland Serbia with the Adriatic was that from Niš, through the mining province of Kopaonik, to Via Drine. Two other [smaller] roads went through Bosnia to the northeast: one was Via Narenta, traversing the canyons of the Neretva, and the other was Via Argentaria, that connected Split with the silver mines of Ilidža and Srebrenica and in turn Sremska Mitrovica in the north.

It had an important cultural role as in connecting the hinterlands with the Adriatic cities which also had a Latin population, and Venice.

References

Sources

Kingdom of Serbia (medieval)
Grand Principality of Serbia
Serbian Empire
Medieval Serbia
Medieval Albania
Medieval Croatia
Economy of Serbia in the Middle Ages
Trade routes
Economy of the Republic of Venice